Thusis railway station is a railway station in Thusis, Switzerland. It is the junction of the Albula and Landquart–Thusis lines of the Rhaetian Railway. The renovated railway station was inaugurated in 1995 and is adorned with three bronze sculptures of Robert Indermaur, a “Sitting Lady waiting for the train", "An elder man waving" and "A young man rushing towards the station".

Services
The following services stop at Thusis:

 Regio: limited service between St. Moritz and Chur.
 Chur S-Bahn : hourly service to Chur.

Gallery

References

External links
 
 
 

Railway stations in Graubünden
Rhaetian Railway stations
Railway stations in Switzerland opened in 1896